Enchylium is a genus of fungi belonging to the family Collemataceae. The genus has a cosmopolitan distribution.

Species
The following species are recognised in the genus Enchylium:
 
Enchylium bachmanianum 
Enchylium coccophorum 
Enchylium confertum 
Enchylium conglomeratum 
Enchylium expansum 
Enchylium flagellatum 
Enchylium ligerinum 
Enchylium limosum 
Enchylium nipponicum 
Enchylium polycarpon 
Enchylium substellatum 
Enchylium tenax

References

Lichen genera
Peltigerales
Peltigerales genera
Taxa named by Erik Acharius
Taxa described in 1810